Selective Repeat ARQ/Selective Reject ARQ is a specific instance of the automatic repeat request (ARQ) protocol used to manage sequence numbers and retransmissions in reliable communications.

Summary
Selective Repeat is part of the automatic repeat request (ARQ). With selective repeat, the sender sends a number of frames specified by a window size even without the need to wait for individual ACK from the receiver as in Go-Back-N ARQ. The receiver may selectively reject a single frame, which may be retransmitted alone; this contrasts with other forms of ARQ, which must send every frame from that point again. The receiver accepts out-of-order frames and buffers them. The sender individually retransmits frames that have timed out.

Concept
It may be used as a protocol for the delivery and acknowledgement of message units, or it may be used as a protocol for the delivery of subdivided message sub-units.

When used as the protocol for the delivery of messages, the sending process continues to send a number of frames specified by a window size even after a frame loss. Unlike Go-Back-N ARQ, the receiving process will continue to accept and acknowledge frames sent after an initial error; this is the general case of the sliding window protocol with both transmit and receive window sizes greater than 1.

The receiver process keeps track of the sequence number of the earliest frame it has not received, and sends that number with every acknowledgement (ACK) it sends. If a frame from the sender does not reach the receiver, the sender continues to send subsequent frames until it has emptied its window. The receiver continues to fill its receiving window with the subsequent frames, replying each time with an ACK containing the sequence number of the earliest missing frame. Once the sender has sent all the frames in its window, it re-sends the frame number given by the ACKs, and then continues where it left off.

The size of the sending and receiving windows must be equal, and half the maximum sequence number (assuming that sequence numbers are numbered from 0 to n−1) to avoid miscommunication in all cases of packets being dropped. To understand this, consider the case when all ACKs are destroyed. If the receiving window is larger than half the maximum sequence number, some, possibly even all, of the packets that are present after timeouts are duplicates that are not recognized as such. The sender moves its window for every packet that is acknowledged.

When used as the protocol for the delivery of subdivided messages it works somewhat differently.  In non-continuous channels where messages may be variable in length, standard ARQ or Hybrid ARQ protocols may treat the message as a single unit.  Alternately selective retransmission may be employed in conjunction with the basic ARQ mechanism where the message is first subdivided into sub-blocks (typically of fixed length) in a process called packet segmentation.  The original variable length message is thus represented as a concatenation of a variable number of sub-blocks.  While in standard ARQ the message as a whole is either acknowledged (ACKed) or negatively acknowledged (NAKed), in ARQ with selective transmission the ACK response would additionally carry a bit flag indicating the identity of each sub-block successfully received.  In ARQ with selective retransmission of sub-divided messages each retransmission diminishes in length, needing to only contain the sub-blocks that were linked.

In most channel models with variable length messages, the probability of error-free reception diminishes in inverse proportion with increasing message length.  In other words, it's easier to receive a short message than a longer message.  Therefore, standard ARQ techniques involving variable length messages have increased difficulty delivering longer messages, as each repeat is the full length.  Selective re-transmission applied to variable length messages completely eliminates the difficulty in delivering longer messages, as successfully delivered sub-blocks are retained after each transmission, and the number of outstanding sub-blocks in following transmissions diminishes. Selective Repeat is implemented in UDP transmission.

Examples
The Transmission Control Protocol uses a variant of Go-Back-N ARQ to ensure reliable transmission of data over the Internet Protocol, which does not provide guaranteed delivery of packets; with Selective Acknowledgement (SACK) extension, it may also use Selective Repeat ARQ.

The ITU-T G.hn standard, which provides a way to create a high-speed (up to 1 Gigabit/s) Local area network using existing home wiring (power lines, phone lines and coaxial cables), uses Selective Repeat ARQ to ensure reliable transmission over noisy media. G.hn employs packet segmentation to sub-divide messages into smaller units, to increase the probability that each one is received correctly.

The STANAG 5066 PROFILE FOR HF RADIO DATA COMMUNICATIONS uses Selective Repeat ARQ, with a maximum window size of 128 protocol-data units (PDUs).

See also
 Go-Back-N ARQ
 Reliable Data Transfer
 Pipeline (software)
 Automatic repeat request
 Computer networking

References

Further reading

Logical link control
Error detection and correction

it:Selective repeat ARQ
ja:Selective Repeat ARQ